The Cook County, Illinois, general election was held on November 6, 1984.

Primaries were held March 20, 1984.

Elections were held for Clerk of the Circuit Court, Recorder of Deeds, State's Attorney, 4 seats on the Water Reclamation District Board, and judgeships on the Circuit Court of Cook County.

Election information
1984 was a presidential election year in the United States. The primaries and general elections for Cook County races coincided with those for federal races (President, Senate, and House) and those for state elections.

Voter turnout

Primary election
Voter turnout in Cook County during the primaries was 46.94%

Chicago saw 58.55% turnout, and suburban Cook County saw 31.99% turnout.

General election
Turnout in the general election was 78.76%, with 2,262,103 ballots cast. Chicago saw 78.23% turnout (with 1,247,630 ballots cast), and suburban Cook County saw 79.42% turnout (with 1,014,473 ballots cast).

Straight-ticket voting
Ballots had a straight-ticket voting option in 1988.

Clerk of the Circuit Court 

In the 1984 Clerk of the Circuit Court of Cook County election,  incumbent clerk Morgan M. Finley, a Democrat first appointed in 1974, was reelected.

Primaries

Democratic

Republican

General election

Recorder of Deeds 

In the 1988 Cook County Recorder of Deeds election, incumbent second-term recorder of deeds Sid Olsen, a Democrat, did not seek reelection. Democrat Harry Yourell was elected to succeed him.

Primaries

Democratic

Republican

General election

State's Attorney 

In the 1984 Cook County State's Attorney election, incumbent first-term state's attorney Richard M. Daley, a Democrat, was reelected.

Primaries

Democratic

Republican
Former superintendent of the Chicago Police Department Richard J. Brzeczek won the Republican primary, running unopposed.

General election

Water Reclamation District Board 

In the 1988 Metropolitan Water Reclamation District of Greater Chicago election, four of the nine seats on the Metropolitan Water Reclamation District of Greater Chicago board were up for election. Three were regularly scheduled elections, and one was a special election due to a vacancy.

Democrats won all four seats up for election.

Judicial elections 
Pasrtisan elections were held for judgeships on the Circuit Court of Cook County due to vacancies. Retention elections were also held for the Circuit Court.

Other elections
Coinciding with the primaries, elections were held to elect the Democratic, Republican, and Citizens committeemen for the wards of Chicago.

See also 
 1984 Illinois elections

References 

Cook County
Cook County, Illinois elections
Cook County 1984
Richard M. Daley
Cook County
Cook County, Illinois elections